The music used on the Doctor Who television series is discussed in the following articles:

 The Doctor Who theme music
 List of Doctor Who music releases
 List of music featured on Doctor Who
List of Doctor Who composers

Music based on Doctor Who